There are several rivers named Pitanga River in Brazil:

 Pitanga River (Paraná)
 Pitanga River (Pernambuco)
 Pitanga River (Sergipe)

See also
 Pitanga (disambiguation)